Waana Morrell Davis QSO was a New Zealand Māori teacher, city councillor for Palmerston North, a founding member of Te Roopu Raranga Whatu o Aotearoa, chairperson of Toi Māori Aotearoa and a member of the New Zealand Conservation Authority. Davis was affiliated with the Ngāti Awa and Ngāti Kahungunu iwi.

Biography 
She was the senior mistress at Awatapu College. In 1983 Davis was one of the original founding members of the steering committee for Aotearoa Moana Nui A Kiwa Weavers which would be succeeded by Te Roopu Raranga Whatu o Aotearoa. In 1984 she was appointed as a city councillor for Palmerston North and held that position until she lost the 1998 election by a slim margin. In 1991 Davis represented Aotearoa at the YWCA World Conference in Oslo and visited museum directors of museums with holdings of taonga maori, in Germany, Austria, Holland, the UK, Scotland and Canada.

Davis went on to be a founding kaitiaki of Toi Māori Aotearoa and then served as the chairperson of the Toi Māori Aotearoa Board from 1999 to 2019.  In 2002 Davis' public service was recognised when she was awarded the Queen's Service Order. In 2007 Davis was appointed as a member of the New Zealand Conservation Authority. She continued to serve until 2017.

Davis described herself as a "facilitator rather than a weaver" but noted that she was "committed to weavers and the important role that raranga plays in Māori society".

Davis died in June 2019 and was buried in Whakatāne in the Bay of Plenty.

Family 
Davis was married to Frank Davis, a painter and lecturer at the former Palmerston North Teachers’ College.

References 

2019 deaths
Māori politicians
20th-century New Zealand politicians
People from Palmerston North
20th-century New Zealand women politicians